Danna may refer to:

Places
 Biblical Danna (Joshua 15:49), identified with Idhna, a modern Palestinian town on the West Bank
 Danna, Baysan, a former Palestinian village depopulated after the 1948 Arab-Israeli War
 Danna, Khyber Pakhtunkhwa, a village in Pakistan
 Island of Danna, a tidal island in Scotland

Other uses
 Danna (name)
 Danna, the traditional patron of a geisha
 Danna Student Center, Loyola University New Orleans

See also
 D'Anna (disambiguation)
 Dana (disambiguation)